The Gratlspitze or Gratlspitz, is a mountain in the Austrian state of Tyrol in the Kitzbühel Alps. It is linked to the Schatzberg to the north.

The mountain lies between the Alpine valleys of Wildschönau and the Alpbach.

There are long views from the summit as a result of its exposed situation as a relatively isolated mountain.

Silver mining was carried out on the mountain for many years. Several gallery entrances and heaps of waste rock are very still visible today (see photo below of the Wildschönauer side).

References 

Mountains of the Alps
Mountains of Tyrol (state)
One-thousanders of Austria
Kitzbühel Alps